Agylla fasciculata is a moth of the family Erebidae. It was described by Francis Walker in 1854. It is found in Venezuela.

References

Moths described in 1854
fasciculata
Moths of South America